Yasnaya Polyana may refer to:
Yasnaya Polyana, the former estate of the writer Leo Tolstoy
Yasnaya Polyana, Tula Oblast, a village in Tula Oblast, Russia, where Tolstoy's former estate is located
Yasnaya Polyana, Altai Krai, a village in Altai Krai, Russia
Yasnaya Polyana, Republic of Dagestan, a village in the Republic of Dagestan, Russia
Yasnaya Polyana, Kaliningrad Oblast, a settlement in Kaliningrad Oblast, Russia
Yasnaya Polyana, Kemerovo Oblast, a settlement in Kemerovo Oblast, Russia
Yasnaya Polyana, Kurgan Oblast, a village in Kurgan Oblast, Russia
Yasnaya Polyana, Orenburg Oblast, a settlement in Orenburg Oblast, Russia
Yasnaya Polyana, Oryol Oblast, a settlement in Oryol Oblast, Russia
Yasnaya Polyana, Anuchinsky District, Primorsky Krai, a village (selo) in Anuchinsky District of Primorsky Krai, Russia
Yasnaya Polyana, Dalnerechensky District, Primorsky Krai, a village (selo) in Dalnerechensky District of Primorsky Krai, Russia
Yasnaya Polyana, Stavropol Krai, a settlement in Stavropol Krai, Russia
Yasnaya Polyana, Yaroslavl Oblast, a village in Yaroslavl Oblast, Russia
Yasnaya Polyana, name of several other rural localities in Russia

See also
Yasnye Polyany, a settlement in Chelyabinsk Oblast, Russia
Yasna polyana, a village in Burgas Province, Bulgaria named after Leo Tolstoy's birthplace
Jasna Polana, an estate turned golf course, near Princeton, NJ (the name is originally Polish with the same meaning as in Russian)
Yasnaia Poliana, pseudonym of Spanish writer Consuelo Berges (1899–1988)